The Andrews-Duncan House is a historic building located at 407 North Blount Street in Raleigh, North Carolina, United States.  Built in 1874 for a prominent businessman, the Italianate style home was designed by architect George S. H. Appleget.  The house was added to the National Register of Historic Places (NRHP) in 1972 and is currently owned by the state government.  A large tree named after a presidential candidate once stood behind the house and is commemorated with a historical marker.

History
In April 1873, Alexander Boyd Andrews (1841–1915), a railroad executive and former Confederate captain in the 1st North Carolina Cavalry Regiment, bought a parcel of land from businessman R. S. Pullen.  The lot was located on the northwest corner of Blount and North Streets in downtown Raleigh.  Andrews chose architect George S. H. Appleget to design his Victorian home.  Appleget's designs in Raleigh include Estey Hall on the campus of Shaw University and the Heck-Andrews House, located next door to the Andrews-Duncan House.  His most well known public building design is the Cabarrus County Courthouse in Concord.  Andrews continued living in the home until his death in 1915.  On October 1, 1919, the Andrews estate sold the home to Laura Duncan Pearson, the wife of a local dentist and widow of a tobacco industrialist.  Ownership of the home remained in the Duncan family until at least the 1970s when the historical survey of the property was completed.  The building currently serves as offices for North Carolina state government workers.

The house was added to the NRHP on January 20, 1972, and declared a Raleigh Historic Landmark on November 6, 1972.  A historical marker in front of the building states: "Alexander B. Andrews/1841-1915/Railroad builder and financier. Vice-president, Southern Railroad; superintendent, North Carolina Railroad. Home is here."

Henry Clay Oak

A large white oak tree, nicknamed the "Henry Clay Oak", previously stood behind the home on the southwest corner of the property. The tree was famous for supposedly being the site where in 1844 politician Henry Clay wrote his letter opposing the annexation of Texas. The publication of that letter was one of the main reasons he lost the 1844 presidential election. Due to weather damage and a deadly root fungus, the tree was felled in October 1991. Two historical markers in front of where the tree once stood state: "Henry Clay Oak/Henry Clay, on a visit to this city, wrote the famous Raleigh Letter, April 17, 1844, opposing the annexation of Texas. Many authorities believe that this statement cost him the presidential election of 1844. According to tradition Clay wrote the letter while sitting under this oak tree, in the yard of Colonel William Polk, at whose home he was a guest./Erected by Colonel Polk Chapter/D.A.R./1939" and "Raleigh/Historic Property/The Henry Clay Oak/Circa 1650"

Architecture
The house is a  two-and-one-half story building designed in the Italianate style.  The basement walls are coursed stone and the building is covered with lapped siding.  It features a gable roof with a false gable on the front and rear sides.  The facade (east side) of the home is five bays wide.  The double door entrance, topped by a two-light lunette, features vertical panels with etched glass and is framed by a ramped architrave and wooden hoodmold.  The three central bays are covered by a hip roof porch supported by pairs of chamfered posts.  A paneled frieze runs between pairs of brackets that are above each pair of posts.  The second floor and gable central bay features a pair of round-headed windows.  These windows are also found on the gable of the north and south sides.  Those sides are four bays wide and feature windows similar to the ones on the facade.  An enclosed addition is on the south side of the house.  The rear (west side) of the home is five bays wide and features a porch similar to the one on the facade.  There is a carriage house, also designed in the Italianate style, located directly behind the building.

See also
 National Register of Historic Places listings in Wake County, North Carolina

References

Houses on the National Register of Historic Places in North Carolina
Italianate architecture in North Carolina
Houses completed in 1874
Houses in Raleigh, North Carolina
National Register of Historic Places in Raleigh, North Carolina